Motion detection is the process of detecting a change in the position of an object relative to its surroundings or a change in the surroundings relative to an object. It can be achieved by either mechanical or electronic methods. When it is done by natural organisms, it is called motion perception.

Methods 

Motion can be detected by monitoring changes in:
Infrared light (passive and active sensors)
Visible light (video and camera systems)
Radio frequency energy (radar, microwave and tomographic motion detection)
Sound (microphones, other acoustic sensors)
Kinetic energy (triboelectric, seismic, and inertia-switch sensors)
Magnetism (magnetic sensors, magnetometers)
Wi-Fi Signals (WiFi Sensing)

Mechanical 

The most basic forms of mechanical motion detection utilize a switch or trigger. For example, the keys of a typewriter use a mechanical method of detecting motion, where each key is a switch that is either off or on, and each letter that appears is a result of the key's motion.

Electronic 

The principal methods by which motion can be electronically identified are optical and acoustic. Infrared light or laser technology can be used for optical detection. Motion-detection devices such as PIR motion detectors have a sensor that detects a disturbance in the infrared spectrum. A signal can then activate an alarm, and/or a camera to capture an image or video of the event.

This method's chief applications are:

 Detection of unauthorized entry
 Turning lights on/off when an area is entered/vacated
 Activating a camera to record new events (e.g. human activity)

A simple algorithm for motion detection by a fixed camera compares the current image with a reference image and monitors the number of different pixels. Since images naturally differ due to factors such as varying lighting, camera flicker, and CCD dark currents, pre-processing is useful to reduce the number of false positive alarms.

More complex algorithms are necessary to detect motion when the camera itself is panning, or when a specific object's motion must be detected in a field containing other, irrelevant movement—for example, a painting surrounded by visitors in an art gallery. With a panning camera, models based on optical flow are used to distinguish between apparent background motion caused by the camera's movement and that of independently moving objects.

Devices
Motion detectors are often integrated components of systems that automatically perform tasks, or alert users of motion in an area. An occupancy sensor detects the entry or movement of a person or thing within a certain space.

Motion controllers are also used for video game consoles as game controllers. A camera can also allow the body's movements to be used for control, such as in the Kinect system.

References

External links
 Relational Motion Detection
 www.cs.rochester.edu/~nelson/research
 Motion Detection Algorithms In Image Processing
 Motion Detection and Recognition Research
 Presence and Absence detection explained
 Motion detection sample algorithm realization video

Security
Motion in computer vision